Lake Toccoa is a reservoir in the U.S. state of Georgia, Stephens County, in the city of Toccoa.

Toccoa comes from the Cherokee word Ꮤꮖꭿ "Tagwâ′hĭ," meaning "Catawba place" or "beautiful".

References

Toccoa
Bodies of water of Stephens County, Georgia